Lady Kinvara Clare Rachel Balfour (born 1975) is an English creative director, producer, writer, and public speaker. She is the second daughter of Roderick Balfour, 5th Earl of Balfour, and Lady Tessa Fitzalan-Howard. Balfour is a niece of the Duke of Norfolk.

Background

Ancestry
Balfour's father is the 5th Earl of Balfour (descended from Eustace Balfour, brother of the British cabinet minister Gerald Balfour, 2nd Earl of Balfour, and brother of the British Prime Minister Arthur Balfour, 1st Earl of Balfour). Her mother, Tessa Balfour, Countess of Balfour, is the eldest daughter of the late 17th Duke of Norfolk, Myles Fitzalan-Howard, and his wife, the Dowager Duchess of Norfolk (formerly Anne Constable-Maxwell). The titles of Duke of Norfolk, Earl of Arundel and Earl Marshal of England are the oldest and premier British aristocratic title after the royal family. The Norfolks are direct descendants of King Edward I and they are also the leading Roman Catholic family in Britain. The family seat is Arundel Castle in West Sussex and Carlton Towers in Yorkshire.

Balfour is a niece of British broadcaster and TV presenter Sir David Frost and also a niece of television and stage actress Marsha Fitzalan.

Education
Balfour attended Lady Eden's School in London, followed by St. Mary's Convent School, Ascot, followed by a degree in English, French and Film at Newcastle University. She completed her post-graduate education at Central School of Speech and Drama.

Career

As playwright
After drama school, Balfour has devoted herself in writing. Her first and best known play Dazed & Abused premiered at the Edinburgh Festival Fringe in 2004, where it was sold out during its three-week run. It later transferred to London and New York where Diane von Fürstenberg made her studio theatre available for the production. In 2008, Kinvara attended the Royal Court Theatre's Creative Writers Programme after which she conceived her second play, After Invisible.

Balfour has also acted in the Oscar-nominated short film Cashback and the short film Away We Stay. In 2013, she performed in immersive theatre phenomenon You Me Bum Bum Train.

Balfour is an ambassador for London's Royal Court Theatre.

As editor and writer
At 17, Balfour won the Lloyd's Fashion Challenge, a competition in fashion design, out of 30,000 entries nationwide, as judged by Vivienne Westwood. Balfour went on to assist Westwood in her design studio. Balfour then joined British couturier Tomasz Starzewski, whose clients included Diana, Princess of Wales and Sarah, Duchess of York. She has also worked for Norman Hartnell, the British couture house which made both the wedding dress and coronation gowns for Queen Elizabeth II.

After university, Kinvara worked as fashion assistant at Conde Nast. Her appointment as Style Editor at the Saturday Telegraph Magazine followed.

In 2004, Balfour was appointed London Editor for US web phenomenon DailyCandy.com by owner, entrepreneur Robert Pittman. She launched the brand internationally to mass acclaim. In 2008, DailyCandy.com was acquired by US media giant Comcast for a reported $125million. In 2012, Balfour launched a digital blog platform for Time Out under new ownership by Peter Dubens. In January 2014, Balfour became Founding Partner of new tech start-up StyleCard, a fashion and lifestyle website 'which features cool, new things and provides exclusive offers on the best of those things'.

As host and public speaker
Balfour is an interpreter of global cultural trends with a focus on fashion and popular culture. She is often considered a "consultant of cool" and a key influencer for international companies and brands. She speaks at events and conferences around the world for corporations including Jimmy Choo, Procter & Gamble, Richemont, Coutts, UBS and Canon.

As of February 2014, Balfour hosts Fashion in Conversation for Apple, a series of interviews in the UK and US with influential names in the industry like Vogue editor-in-chief Anna Wintour, blogger Scott Schuman aka The Sartorialist, fashion designers Zac Posen, Marchesa, Proenza Schouler, Mary Katrantzou, Anya Hindmarch, Manolo Blahnik, "Queen of the Green Carpet" Livia Firth and Academy Award winning costume designer Sandy Powell among others. On 7 April 2014, designer Tom Ford announced his marriage to Richard Buckley during a Fashion in Conversation interview with Balfour. The series is available worldwide on iTunes.

In September 2014, Balfour acted as guest host for The AOL BUILD Speaker Series in New York, interviewing fashion designer Zac Posen, Dao-Yi Chow and Maxwell Osborne of Public School, and Jens Grede, Co-Founder of Industrie Magazine, Saturday Group and FRAME Denim.

Balfour has lectured at London's Victoria & Albert Museum.

As producer and creative director
As of 2014, Balfour is working on a fashion-based documentary series about industry visionaries called Fashion Week for US and UK television.

Balfour was Executive Producer on McQueen (2018) - a documentary film about the late British designer Alexander McQueen - Directed by Ian Bonhôte and scripted by Peter Ettedgui.

Personal life
In 2009, Balfour married Italian Count Riccardo Lanza at Arundel Castle, West Sussex. They divorced in 2011. Balfour and her partner, Surf Air chief executive Sudhin Shahani, have a son born in October 2018.

References

External links

British dramatists and playwrights
Date of birth missing (living people)
Daughters of British earls
People educated at St Mary's School, Ascot
1975 births
Living people
Kinvara